Metrodira is a genus of starfish in the family Echinasteridae in the order Spinulosida.

Species
The following species are recognised by the World Register of Marine Species :- 

Metrodira dubia
Metrodira gracilenta Lovén
Metrodira subtilis (Lutken, 1871)
Metrodira subulata Gray, 1840

References

Echinasteridae